Gabriela Sabatini was the defending champion of the singles event of the 1989 Virginia Slims of Florida tennis tournament but lost in the third round to Terry Phelps.

Steffi Graf won in the final 4–6, 6–2, 6–3 against Chris Evert.

Seeds
A champion seed is indicated in bold text while text in italics indicates the round in which that seed was eliminated. The top eight seeds received a bye to the second round.

  Steffi Graf (champion)
  Gabriela Sabatini (third round)
  Chris Evert (final)
  Helena Suková (semifinals)
  Mary Joe Fernández (quarterfinals)
  Sylvia Hanika (second round)
  Helen Kelesi (quarterfinals)
  Arantxa Sánchez (third round)
  Sandra Cecchini (second round)
  Bettina Fulco (first round)
  Nicole Provis (second round)
  Susan Sloane (second round)
  Raffaella Reggi (first round)
  Nathalie Tauziat (second round)
  Barbara Paulus (third round)
  Anne Minter (first round)

Draw

Finals

Top half

Section 1

Section 2

Bottom half

Section 3

Section 4

References

 1989 Virginia Slims of Florida Draw

Virginia Slims of Florida
1989 WTA Tour